Pocklington Rugby Football Club is an English rugby union team based in Pocklington, East Riding of Yorkshire. The club runs three senior sides, two colts teams and eleven junior teams with the first XV currently playing in North 1 East.

The club hosts an annual Sevens tournament every Good Friday called the Pock 7s which attracts teams from across the north of England.

History
Rugby in Pocklington began in 1879 with Pocklington Rugby Club formed in 1928 following nearly half a century of teams coming and going in the East Yorkshire market town. Four years later the club bought its ground at Percy Road. In 1958 the club organised its first Sevens tournament and this has gone on to become one of the country's leading tournaments. The club has won the tournament twice (1996 and 1998). Since league rugby was introduced in 1987 the club has participated in the upper echelons of the Yorkshire and the north east divisions. The club won two consecutive promotions in the early 2010s and after five seasons in North 1 East the club won promotion to the national leagues for the first time. However this proved to be a step too far. The club finished bottom of the North Premier, winning just three matches all season, and was immediately relegated back to North 1 East.

Club Honours
Yorkshire 1 champions: 1995–96
North East 3 champions: 1997–98
North East 2 champions: 1999–00
Yorkshire 3 champions: 2003–04
Yorkshire 2 champions: 2010–11
Yorkshire 1 champions: 2011–12
North 1 East champions: 2016–17

Ground
The club's main ground is at Percy Road. It comprises two pitches and a clubhouse. The club also has a secondary ground on Kilnwick Road, just to the east of the town. Consisting of two pitches, this ground is used primarily for junior rugby.

Notable former players

Frank Mitchell
Rob Webber

References

External links
Official club website

English rugby union teams
Rugby clubs established in 1928
Sport in the East Riding of Yorkshire
Pocklington